The Fountain of Valle Giulia is a fountain in the Valle Giulia area of Rome.  It was immortalised in the symphonic poem Fontane di Roma by Ottorino Respighi.

Valle Giulia